Occoquan may refer to:
Occoquan, Virginia
Occoquan River
Occoquan Bay National Wildlife Refuge
Lorton and Occoquan Railroad
Occoquan Workhouse (prison)
1917 imprisonment of suffragettes at the Occoquan workhouse